Muhammad Saleem is a Pakistani Surgeon and academic. He serves as Medical Director and Professor of Paediatric Surgery in the Children's Hospital, Lahore.

Early life
Saleem was born in Bahawalnagar. He earned his MBBS from Quaid-e-Azam Medical College, and completed his post-graduate training FCPS (Paediatric Surgery) from the Department of Paediatric Surgery Mayo Hospital, Lahore. He was awarded FCPS (Paediatric Surgery) in 1995. He completed a Masters in medical education (MME-HPE) from The University of Lahore in 2017.

Saleem was appointed Senior Registrar Paediatric Surgery at The Children’s Hospital and Institute of Child Health (CH & ICH) Lahore in 1996. Shortly after that, Saleem was promoted to Assistant Professor Paediatric Surgery at Bahawalpur Victoria Hospital, Bahawalpur. He moved back to the CH & ICH, Lahore, where he served as Assistant Professor for eight years.

Saleem was promoted to Associate Professor in 2008 and served for the next two years. Saleem was selected as Professor of Paediatric Surgery and was appointed to Shaikh Zayed Medical College, Rahim Yar Khan, in 2010.

In 2013, Saleem moved back to CH & ICH, Lahore, as Professor of Paedaitric Surgery/Chief of Surgery. 

Saleem remained continuously involved in the project of The Children’s Hospital & Institute of Child Health, Lahore in the 1990s. He established pediatric surgery in this hospital. 

While working in Rahim Yar Khan, he developed a pediatric surgical department at Shaikh Zayed Medical College. He also contributed to establishing two new pediatric surgery units in Fatima Jinnah Medical University/Ganga Ram Hospital, Lahore, and Allama Iqbal Medical College/Jinnah Hospital, Lahore.

Publications
Saleem has authored over 80 publications in various national and international academic magazines.

References

Pakistani paediatric surgeons
Year of birth missing (living people)
Living people
People from Bahawalnagar District
Quaid-i-Azam University alumni
Academic staff of the University of Lahore